Questar may refer to:
Questar Corporation, telescope manufacturer
Questar Corporation (gas company), natural gas-focused energy company
Questar, cartoon character leader of the Valorians in Dino-riders
Questar Science Fiction, publisher of science fiction
Bull Questar, Honeywell-Bull brand of mainframe terminals